Krob may refer to:

 KROB, a Texas radio station

People
 Andrej Krob (born 1938), Czech theater director and screenwriter
 Jan Krob, Czech footballer
 K-Rob, American rapper